The Minister of Statistics in New Zealand is a cabinet position appointed by the Prime Minister to be charged with the responsibility of Statistics New Zealand.

The current minister is Deborah Russell.

List of ministers
The following ministers have held the office of Minister of Statistics.

Key

Notes

References

Statistics
Political office-holders in New Zealand